Matt Godfrey (born January 16, 1981) is a Wampanoag former professional boxer who competed from 2004 to 2012. He challenged for the WBO cruiserweight title in 2010.

Amateur career
Godfrey, who is a close friend of Jason Estrada since his childhood, had an outstanding amateur career prior to turning professional.

He was the 2000 U.S. National Amateur Champion at Middleweight, 2002 National Golden Gloves Heavyweight Champion, and 2004 U.S. National Amateur Heavyweight Champion.

With a relaxed stick-and-move style but only average power he won a bronze medal at the 2001 Pan Am Games.

He was also a second alternate for the 2004 U.S. Olympic Team after losing 8-17 to Devin Vargas (whom Godfrey had beaten before on another occasion). He lost three times to Aaron Williams; on the other hand, he holds three wins over Chazz Witherspoon.

He compiled a 194-23 amateur record.

Amateur highlights 
2000 U.S. National Amateur Champion Middleweight (165 lbs)
2001 Bronze Medalist in Pan-American Games
2002 National Golden Gloves Heavyweight Champion
2004 U.S. National Amateur Heavyweight Champion
Second alternate for 2004 U.S. Olympic Team
6-time New England Golden Gloves Champion

Professional career
Godfrey, who is now trained by Dr. Roland Estrada and Ross Enamait, turned professional in 2004. He made his professional debut at the Convention Center in Providence, Rhode Island, in May 2004.

After defeating two veterans in the summer of 2005, Godfrey beat Billy Willis by decision at the Convention Center in Providence and improved to 10-0. Godfrey stopped Ernest M-16 Mateen in the second round in February 2006.

Godfrey's next fight was the turning point in his career. He was matched up against amateur star Shaun George (also 11-0) in May 2006. George never had a chance, getting pummeled and knocked out in the first round.

In April 2007 Godfrey was pitted against star of the Contender Series Felix Cora Jr. in the Main Event of the evening. In a fight that commentators noted was probably his first real test against a left-hander, Godfrey turned southpaw himself for two rounds to effectively outscore Cora, before knocking him down midway through the second round. Cora regained his feet, but did not provide any offense and the referee waved the fight off shortly thereafter.

Four months later Godfrey defeated Derrick Brown by decision which earned him a world title eliminator against Czech amateur star Rudolf Kraj. Godfrey was 16-0 while Kraj was 13-0. The fight took place in Kraj's adopted home country of Germany, and Kraj won on points.

Nearly six months later one of Godfrey's most exciting fights took place at Mohegan Sun in Connecticut. He fought Emmanuel Nwodo, who proved to be a tough fight for Godfrey, but in the end Godfrey knocked him out in the 4th round.

Godfrey earned his 18th win against Edward Gutierrez in November 2008, pitched a shutout against undefeated Shawn Hawk (18-0) and improved to 20-1 with 10 KOs with a split decision win over veteran Michael Simms. The win earned Godfrey a shot at Marco Huck's WBO title, which he lost by KO5. He lost again to the undefeated Lateef Kayode on points.

Professional boxing record

|-
|align="center" colspan=8|21 wins (11 knockouts, 10 decisions), 3 losses (1 knockout, 2 decisions) 
|-
| align="center" style="border-style: none none solid solid; background: #e3e3e3"|Result
| align="center" style="border-style: none none solid solid; background: #e3e3e3"|Record
| align="center" style="border-style: none none solid solid; background: #e3e3e3"|Opponent
| align="center" style="border-style: none none solid solid; background: #e3e3e3"|Type
| align="center" style="border-style: none none solid solid; background: #e3e3e3"|Round
| align="center" style="border-style: none none solid solid; background: #e3e3e3"|Date
| align="center" style="border-style: none none solid solid; background: #e3e3e3"|Location
| align="center" style="border-style: none none solid solid; background: #e3e3e3"|Notes
|-align=center
|Win
|
|align=left| Jesse Oltmanns
|TKO
|5 (6), 
|19/07/2012
|align=left| Twin River Casino, Lincoln, Rhode Island, U.S.
|align=left|
|-
|Loss
|
|align=left| Lateef Kayode
|UD
|10
|10/06/2011
|align=left| Chumash Casino, Santa Ynez, California, U.S.
|align=left|
|-
|Loss
|
|align=left| Marco Huck
|TKO
|5 (12), 
|21/08/2010
|align=left| Messehalle, Erfurt, Germany
|align=left|
|-
|Win
|
|align=left| Michael Simms
|SD
|10
|12/09/2009
|align=left| Red Lion Hotels, Sacramento, California, U.S.
|align=left|
|-
|Win
|
|align=left| Shawn Hawk
|UD
|10
|10/07/2009
|align=left| Asylum Arena, Philadelphia, Pennsylvania, U.S.
|align=left|
|-
|Win
|
|align=left| Edward Gutierrez
|UD
|10
|22/11/2008
|align=left| 4 Bears Casino & Lodge, New Town, North Dakota, U.S.
|align=left|
|-
|Win
|
|align=left| Emmanuel Nwodo
|TKO
|4 (10), 
|29/08/2008
|align=left| Mohegan Sun, Uncasville, Connecticut, U.S.
|align=left|
|-
|Loss
|
|align=left| Rudolf Kraj
|UD
|12
|08/03/2008
|align=left| König Palast, Krefeld, Germany
|align=left|
|-
|Win
|
|align=left| Derrick Brown
|UD
|10
|10/08/2007
|align=left| Twin River Casino, Lincoln, Rhode Island, U.S.
|align=left|
|-
|Win
|
|align=left| Felix Cora, Jr.
|TKO
|2 (12), 
|06/04/2007
|align=left| Mohegan Sun, Uncasville, Connecticut, U.S.
|align=left|
|-
|Win
|
|align=left| Lloyd Bryan
|TKO
|4 (8), 
|01/12/2006
|align=left| Rhode Island Convention Center, Providence, Rhode Island, U.S.
|align=left|
|-
|Win
|
|align=left| Danny Batchelder
|UD
|12
|23/09/2006
|align=left| Connecticut Convention Center, Hartford, Connecticut, U.S.
|align=left|
|-
|Win
|
|align=left| Shaun George
|TKO
|1 (12), 
|10/05/2006
|align=left| Foxwoods Resort, Mashantucket, Connecticut, U.S.
|align=left|
|-
|Win
|
|align=left| Ernest Mateen
|TKO
|2 (6), 
|13/02/2006
|align=left| Dunkin' Donuts Center, Providence, Rhode Island, U.S.
|align=left|
|-
|Win
|
|align=left| Billy Willis
|UD
|6
|23/11/2005
|align=left| Rhode Island Convention Center, Providence, Rhode Island, U.S.
|align=left|
|-
|Win
|
|align=left| Willie Herring
|UD
|10
|26/08/2005
|align=left| Rhode Island Convention Center, Providence, Rhode Island, U.S.
|align=left|
|-
|Win
|
|align=left| Jermell Barnes
|UD
|8
|17/06/2005
|align=left| Dunkin' Donuts Center, Providence, Rhode Island, U.S.
|align=left|
|-
|Win
|
|align=left| Tony De la Garza
|TKO
|1 (6), 
|01/04/2005
|align=left| City Wide Fieldhouse, New Haven, Connecticut, U.S.
|align=left|
|-
|Win
|
|align=left| Joe Johnson
|TKO
|4 (6), 
|29/10/2004
|align=left| Foxwoods Resort, Mashantucket, Connecticut, U.S.
|align=left|
|-
|Win
|
|align=left| Andrew Hutchinson
|TKO
|4
|01/10/2004
|align=left| Bayside Expo Center, Boston, Massachusetts, U.S.
|align=left|
|-
|Win
|
|align=left| Chris C. Riley
|UD
|4
|27/07/2004
|align=left| A La Carte Event Pavilion, Tampa, Florida, U.S.
|align=left|
|-
|Win
|
|align=left| Charles Tucker
|TKO
|1 (4), 
|20/07/2004
|align=left| Joplin Memorial Hall, Joplin, Missouri, U.S.
|align=left|
|-
|Win
|
|align=left| Fitzroy Henry
|TKO
|1 (4), 
|12/06/2004
|align=left| Foxwoods Resort, Mashantucket, Connecticut, U.S.
|align=left|
|-
|Win
|
|align=left| Glen Morgan
|UD
|4
|14/05/2004
|align=left| Rhode Island Convention Center, Providence, Rhode Island, U.S.
|align=left|
|}

References

External links
 
 CES Boxing official website

1981 births
Living people
Sportspeople from Providence, Rhode Island
Native American boxers
Cruiserweight boxers
Boxers from Rhode Island
National Golden Gloves champions
Winners of the United States Championship for amateur boxers
American male boxers